Donald Joyce Hall (born July 9, 1928) is an American billionaire businessman, and the chairman and majority shareholder of Hallmark Cards, the world's largest greeting card manufacturer and one of the world's largest privately held companies. Hallmark's headquarters is in Kansas City, Missouri.

Early life
Donald Joyce Hall was born on July 9, 1928, to Elizabeth Ann (née Dilday) and Joyce Hall. His father was the founder and president of Hallmark Cards. Hall graduated from Dartmouth College in 1950 with a Bachelor of Arts.

Career
Hall came to Hallmark in 1953 and became assistant to the president in 1954. In 1958, Hall became vice president. In 1966, after Hall served as administrative vice president and member of the board of directors of the company, Hall's father, Joyce Hall, retired as chairman, president, and CEO of Hallmark, handing full control of the company to Hall. In 1986, Hall stepped down as president and CEO of Hallmark, turning those positions over to Irvine O. Hockaday Jr., a native Kansas Citian and national businessman. Hall, however, retained the position of chairman of the board.

Personal life
Hall married Adele Coryell (1931–2013) on November 28, 1953. They had three children, including Donald J. Hall Jr. Hall lives in Mission Hills, Kansas.

Awards and honors
1972: Kansas Citizen of the Year
1992: Kansas Business Hall of Fame in 1992
1995: Golden Plate Award of the American Academy of Achievement

See also
List of billionaires

References

1928 births
Living people
American chief executives of manufacturing companies
Businesspeople from Kansas
Dartmouth College alumni
People from Mission Hills, Kansas
Hallmark Cards people
American billionaires